Child Marriage in Sudan. In 2017 in Sudan, 34% of girls are married off before the 18 years old. 12% are married before they turn 15. Sudan is the 29th highest nation in the world for child marriage.

Legal age of marriage
The current legal marriage of children in Sudan is at age 18, after the nation removed all exemptions to the African Charter on the Rights and Welfare of the Child (ACRWC) in late 2020.  This ratified all articles and explicitly outlawed child marriage.   Previously, there was lax legislation and the legal marriageable age was 10.

References 

Sudan
Childhood in Sudan
Sexuality in Sudan
Social issues in Sudan
Violence against women in Sudan